

Events

Pre-1600
1430 – Joan of Arc is captured at the Siege of Compiègne by troops from the Burgundian faction.
1498 – Girolamo Savonarola is burned at the stake in Florence, Italy.
1533 – The marriage of King Henry VIII to Catherine of Aragon is declared null and void.
1568 – Dutch rebels led by Louis of Nassau, defeat Jean de Ligne, Duke of Arenberg, and his loyalist troops in the Battle of Heiligerlee, opening the Eighty Years' War.

1601–1900
1609 – Official ratification of the Second Virginia Charter takes place.
1618 – The Second Defenestration of Prague precipitates the Thirty Years' War.
1706 – John Churchill, 1st Duke of Marlborough, defeats a French army under Marshal François de Neufville, duc de Villeroy at the Battle of Ramillies.
1788 – South Carolina ratifies the United States Constitution as the eighth American state.
1793 – Battle of Famars during the Flanders Campaign of the War of the First Coalition.
1829 – Accordion patent granted to Cyrill Demian in Vienna, Austrian Empire.
1844 – Declaration of the Báb the evening before the 23rd: A merchant of Shiraz announces that he is a Prophet and founds a religious movement that would later be brutally crushed by the Persian government. He is considered to be a forerunner of the Baháʼí Faith; Baháʼís celebrate the day as a holy day.
1846 – Mexican–American War: President Mariano Paredes of Mexico unofficially declares war on the United States.
1863 – The General German Workers' Association, a precursor of the modern Social Democratic Party of Germany, is founded in Leipzig, Kingdom of Saxony.
1873 – The Canadian Parliament establishes the North-West Mounted Police, the forerunner of the Royal Canadian Mounted Police.
1900 – American Civil War: Sergeant William Harvey Carney is awarded the Medal of Honor for his heroism in the Assault on the Battery Wagner in 1863.

1901–present
1905 – The Sultan of the Ottoman Empire Abdul Hamid II publicly announces the creation of the Ullah Millet for the Aromanians of the empire, which had been established one day earlier. For this reason, the Aromanian National Day is usually celebrated on May 23, although some do so on May 22 instead.
1907 – The unicameral Parliament of Finland gathers for its first plenary session.
1911 – The New York Public Library is dedicated.
1915 – World War I: Italy joins the Allies, fulfilling its part of the Treaty of London.
1932 – In Brazil, four students are shot and killed during a manifestation against the Brazilian dictator Getúlio Vargas, which resulted in the outbreak of the Constitutionalist Revolution several weeks later.
1934 – American bank robbers Bonnie and Clyde are ambushed by police and killed in Bienville Parish, Louisiana.
  1934   – The Auto-Lite strike culminates in the "Battle of Toledo", a five-day melée between 1,300 troops of the Ohio National Guard and 6,000 picketers.
1939 – The U.S. Navy submarine USS Squalus sinks off the coast of New Hampshire during a test dive, causing the death of 24 sailors and two civilian technicians. The remaining 32 sailors and one civilian naval architect are rescued the following day.
1945 – World War II: Heinrich Himmler, head of the Schutzstaffel, commits suicide while in Allied custody.
  1945   – World War II: Germany's Flensburg Government under Karl Dönitz is dissolved when its members are arrested by British forces.
1948 – Thomas C. Wasson, the US Consul-General, is assassinated in Jerusalem, Israel.
1949 – Cold War: The Western occupying powers approve the Basic Law and establish a new German state, the Federal Republic of Germany.
1951 – Tibetans sign the Seventeen Point Agreement with China.
1960 – A tsunami caused by an earthquake in Chile the previous day kills 61 people in Hilo, Hawaii.
1971 – Seventy-eight people are killed when Aviogenex Flight 130 crashes on approach to Rijeka Airport in present-day Rijeka, Croatia (then the Socialist Federal Republic of Yugoslavia).
  1971   – The Intercontinental Hotel in Bucharest opens, becoming the second-tallest building in the city.
1992 – Italy's most prominent anti-mafia judge Giovanni Falcone, his wife and three body guards are killed by the Corleonesi clan with a half-ton bomb near Capaci, Sicily. His friend and colleague Paolo Borsellino will be assassinated less than two months later, making 1992 a turning point in the history of Italian Mafia prosecutions.
1995 – The first version of the Java programming language is released.
1998 – The Good Friday Agreement is accepted in a referendum in Northern Ireland with roughly 75% voting yes.
2002 – The "55 parties" clause of the Kyoto Protocol is reached after its ratification by Iceland.
2006 – Alaskan stratovolcano Mount Cleveland erupts.
2008 – The International Court of Justice (ICJ) awards Middle Rocks to Malaysia and Pedra Branca (Pulau Batu Puteh) to Singapore, ending a 29-year territorial dispute between the two countries.
2013 – A freeway bridge carrying Interstate 5 over the Skagit River collapses in Mount Vernon, Washington.
2014 – Seven people, including the perpetrator, are killed and another 14 injured in a killing spree near the campus of University of California, Santa Barbara.
2015 – At least 46 people are killed as a result of floods caused by a tornado in Texas and Oklahoma.
2016 – Two suicide bombings, conducted by the Islamic State of Iraq and Syria, kill at least 45 potential army recruits in Aden, Yemen.
  2016   – Eight bombings are carried out by the Islamic State of Iraq and Syria in Jableh and Tartus, coastline cities in Syria. One hundred eighty-four people are killed and at least 200 people injured.
2017 – Philippine President Rodrigo Duterte declares martial law in Mindanao, following the Maute's attack in Marawi.
2021 – A cable car falls from a mountain near Lake Maggiore in northern Italy, killing 14 people.
  2021   – Ryanair Flight 4978 is forced to land by Belarusian authorities to detain dissident journalist Roman Protasevich.
2022 – Anthony Albanese of the Australian Labor Party is sworn in as the 31st Prime Minister of Australia after winning the 2022 Australian federal election, ending 9 years of conservative rule.

Births

Pre-1600
 635 – K'inich Kan Bahlam II, Mayan king (d. 702)
 675 – Perumbidugu Mutharaiyar II, King of Mutharaiyar dynasty, Tamil Nadu, India
1052 – Philip I of France (d. 1108)
1100 – Emperor Qinzong of Song (d. 1161)
1127 – Uijong of Goryeo, Korean monarch of the Goryeo dynasty (d. 1173)
1330 – Gongmin of Goryeo, Korean ruler (d. 1374)
1586 – Paul Siefert, German composer and organist (d. 1666)

1601–1900
1606 – Juan Caramuel y Lobkowitz, Spanish mathematician and philosopher (d. 1682)
1614 – Bertholet Flemalle, Flemish Baroque painter (d. 1675)
1617 – Elias Ashmole, English astrologer and politician (d. 1692)
1629 – William VI, Landgrave of Hesse-Kassel, noble of Hesse-Kassel (d. 1663)
1707 – Carl Linnaeus, Swedish botanist, physician, and zoologist (d. 1778)
1718 – William Hunter, Scottish-English anatomist and physician (d. 1783)
1729 – Giuseppe Parini, Italian poet and educator (d. 1799)
1730 – Prince Augustus Ferdinand of Prussia, Prussian prince and general (d. 1813)
1734 – Franz Mesmer, German physician and astrologer (d. 1815)
1741 – Andrea Luchesi, Italian organist and composer (d. 1801)
1789 – Franz Schlik, Austrian earl and general (d. 1862)
1790 – Jules Dumont d'Urville, French admiral and explorer (d. 1842)
  1790   – James Pradier, French neoclassical sculptor (d. 1852)
1794 – Ignaz Moscheles, Czech pianist and composer (d. 1870)
1795 – Charles Barry, English architect, designed the Upper Brook Street Chapel and Halifax Town Hall (d. 1860)
1800 – Rómulo Díaz de la Vega, Mexican general and president (1855) (d. 1877)
1810 – Margaret Fuller, American journalist and critic (d. 1850)
1817 – Manuel Robles Pezuela, Unconstitutional Mexican interim president (d. 1862) 
1820 – James Buchanan Eads, American engineer, designed the Eads Bridge (d. 1887)
  1820   – Lorenzo Sawyer, American lawyer and judge (d. 1891)
1824 – Ambrose Burnside, American general and politician, 30th Governor of Rhode Island (d. 1881)
1834 – Jānis Frīdrihs Baumanis, Latvian architect (d. 1891)
  1834   – Carl Bloch, Danish painter and academic (d. 1890)
1837 – Anatole Mallet, Swiss mechanical engineer and inventor (d. 1919)
  1837   – Józef Wieniawski, Polish pianist and composer (d. 1912)
1838 – Amaldus Nielsen, Norwegian painter (d. 1932)
1840 – George Throssell, Irish-Australian politician, 2nd Premier of Western Australia (d. 1910)
1844 – `Abdu'l-Bahá, Iranian religious leader (d. 1921)
1848 – Otto Lilienthal, German pilot and engineer (d. 1896)
1855 – Isabella Ford, English author and activist (d. 1924)
1861 – József Rippl-Rónai, Hungarian painter (d. 1927)
1863 – Władysław Horodecki, Polish architect (d. 1930)
1864 – William O'Connor, American fencer (d. 1939)
1865 – Epitácio Pessoa, Brazilian jurist and politician, 11th President of Brazil (d. 1942)
1875 – Alfred P. Sloan, American businessman and philanthropist (d. 1966)
1882 – William Halpenny, Canadian pole vaulter (d. 1960)
1883 – Douglas Fairbanks, American actor, director, producer, and screenwriter (d. 1939)
1884 – Corrado Gini, Italian sociologist and demographer (d. 1965)
1887 – Thoralf Skolem, Norwegian mathematician and theorist (d. 1963)
  1887   – Nikolai Vekšin, Estonian-Russian sailor and captain (d. 1951)
  1887   – C. R. M. F. Cruttwell, English historian (d. 1941)
1888 – Adriaan Roland Holst, Dutch writer (d. 1976)
  1888   – Zack Wheat, American baseball player and police officer (d. 1972)
1889 – Ernst Niekisch, German educator and politician (d. 1967)
1890 – Herbert Marshall, English-American actor and singer (d. 1966)
1891 – Pär Lagerkvist, Swedish novelist, playwright, and poet, Nobel Prize laureate (d. 1974)
1892 – Albert Spencer, 7th Earl Spencer, British peer (d. 1975)
1896 – Felix Steiner, Russian-German SS officer (d. 1966)
1897 – Jimmie Guthrie, Scottish motorcycle racer (d. 1937)
1898 – Scott O'Dell, American soldier, journalist, and author (d. 1989)
  1898   – Josef Terboven, German soldier and politician (d. 1945)
1899 – Jeralean Talley, American super-centenarian (d. 2015)
1900 – Hans Frank, German lawyer and politician (d. 1946)
  1900   – Franz Leopold Neumann, German lawyer and theorist (d. 1954)

1901–present
1908 – John Bardeen, American physicist and engineer, Nobel Prize laureate (d. 1991)
  1908   – Hélène Boucher, French pilot (d. 1934)
1910 – Margaret Wise Brown, American author and educator (d. 1952)
  1910   – Hugh Casson, English architect and academic (d. 1999)
  1910   – Scatman Crothers, American actor and comedian (d. 1986)
  1910   – Franz Kline, American painter and academic  (d. 1962)
  1910   – Artie Shaw, American clarinet player, composer, and bandleader (d. 2004)
1911 – Lou Brouillard, Canadian boxer (d. 1984)
  1911   – Paul Augustin Mayer, German cardinal (d. 2010)
  1911   – Betty Nuthall, English tennis player (d. 1983)
1912 – Jean Françaix, French pianist and composer (d. 1997)
  1912   – John Payne, American actor (d. 1989)
1914 – Harold Hitchcock, English visionary landscape artist (d. 2009)
  1914   – Celestine Sibley, American journalist and author (d. 1999)
  1914   – Barbara Ward, Baroness Jackson of Lodsworth, English economist, journalist, and prominent Catholic layperson (d. 1981)
1915 – S. Donald Stookey, American physicist and chemist, invented CorningWare (d. 2014)
1917 – Edward Norton Lorenz, American mathematician and meteorologist (d. 2008)
1918 – Denis Compton, English cricketer and sportscaster (d. 1997)
1919 – Robert Bernstein, American author and playwright (d. 1988)
  1919   – Ruth Fernández, Puerto Rican contralto and a member of the Puerto Rican Senate (d. 2012)
  1919   – Betty Garrett, American actress, singer, and dancer (d. 2011)
1920 – Helen O'Connell, American singer (d. 1993)
1921 – Humphrey Lyttelton, British jazz musician and broadcaster (d. 2008)
1923 – Alicia de Larrocha, Catalan-Spanish pianist (d. 2009)
  1923   – Irving Millman, American virologist and microbiologist (d. 2012)
1924 – Karlheinz Deschner, German author and activist (d. 2014)
1925 – Joshua Lederberg, American biologist and geneticist, Nobel Prize laureate (d. 2008)
1926 – Basil Salvadore D'Souza, Indian bishop (d. 1996)
  1926   – Joe Slovo, Lithuanian-South African activist and politician (d. 1995)
1928 – Rosemary Clooney, American singer and actress (d. 2002)
  1928   – Nigel Davenport, English actor (d. 2013)
  1928   – Nina Otkalenko, Russian runner (d. 2015)
1929 – Ulla Jacobsson, Swedish-Austrian actress (d. 1982)
1930 – Friedrich Achleitner, German poet and critic (d. 2019)
1931 – Barbara Barrie, American actress 
1932 – Kevork Ajemian, Syrian-French journalist and author (d. 1998)
1933 – Joan Collins, English actress
  1933   – Ove Fundin, Swedish motorcycle racer
1934 – Robert Moog, electronic engineer and inventor of the Moog synthesizer (d. 2005)
1935 – Lasse Strömstedt, Swedish author (d. 2009)
1936 – Ingeborg Hallstein, German soprano and actress
  1936   – Charles Kimbrough, American actor 
1939 – Michel Colombier, French-American composer and conductor (d. 2004)
  1939   – Reinhard Hauff, German director and screenwriter
1940 – Bjorn Johansen, Norwegian saxophonist  (d. 2002)
  1940   – Gérard Larrousse, French race car driver
  1940   – Cora Sadosky, Argentinian mathematician and academic (d. 2010)
1941 – Zalman King, American director, producer, and screenwriter (d. 2012)
  1941   – Rod Thorn, American basketball player, coach, and executive
1942 – Gabriel Liiceanu, Romanian philosopher, author, and academic
  1942   – Kovelamudi Raghavendra Rao, Indian director, screenwriter, and choreographer
1943 – Peter Kenilorea, Solomon Islands politician, 1st Prime Minister of the Solomon Islands (d. 2016)
1944 – John Newcombe, Australian tennis player and sportscaster
1945 – Padmarajan, Indian director, screenwriter, and author (d. 1991)
1946 – David Graham, Australian golfer
1947 – Jane Kenyon, American poet and translator (d. 1995)
1948 – Myriam Boyer, French actress, director, and producer
1949 – Daniel DiNardo, American cardinal
  1949   – Alan García, Peruvian lawyer and politician, 61st and 64th President of Peru (d. 2019)
1950 – Martin McGuinness, Irish republican and Sinn Féin politician, Deputy First Minister of Northern Ireland (d. 2017)
1951 – Anatoly Karpov, Russian chess player
  1951   – Antonis Samaras, Greek economist and politician, 185th Prime Minister of Greece
1952 – Martin Parr, English photographer and journalist
1954 – Gerry Armstrong, Northern Irish international footballer 
  1954   – Marvelous Marvin Hagler, American boxer and actor (d. 2021)
1955 – Luka Bloom, Irish singer-songwriter and guitarist
1956 – Andrea Pazienza, Italian illustrator and painter (d. 1988)
  1956   – Ursula Plassnik, Austrian politician and diplomat, Foreign Minister of Austria
  1956   – Buck Showalter, American baseball player, coach, and manager
1958 – Mitch Albom, American journalist, author, and screenwriter
  1958   – Drew Carey, American actor, game show host, and entrepreneur
  1958   – Lea DeLaria, American actress and singer
1959 – Marcella Mesker, Dutch tennis player and sportscaster
1960 – Linden Ashby, American actor
1961 – Daniele Massaro, Italian footballer and manager 
  1961   – Norrie May-Welby, Scottish Australian gender activist  
1962 – Karen Duffy, American actress 
1963 – Viviane Baladi, Swiss mathematician
1964 – Ruth Metzler, Swiss lawyer and politician
1965 – Manuel Sanchís Hontiyuelo, Spanish footballer
  1965   – Tom Tykwer, German director, producer, screenwriter, and composer
  1965   – Melissa McBride, American actress
  1965   – Paul Sironen, Australian rugby league player
1966 – Graeme Hick, Zimbabwean-English cricketer and coach
  1966   – Gary Roberts, Canadian ice hockey player and coach
1967 – Luís Roberto Alves, Mexican footballer
  1967   – Anna Ibrisagic, Swedish politician
1968 – Guinevere Turner, American actress and screenwriter
1970 – Bryan Herta, American race car driver and businessman, co-founded Bryan Herta Autosport
1971 – George Osborne, English journalist and politician, former Chancellor of the Exchequer
1972 – Rubens Barrichello, Brazilian race car driver
  1972   – Martin Saggers, English cricketer and umpire
1973 – Maxwell, American singer-songwriter and producer
1974 – Jewel, American singer-songwriter, guitarist, actress, and poet
  1974   – Manuela Schwesig, German politician, German Federal Minister of Family Affairs
1976 – Ricardinho, Brazilian footballer and manager
1977 – Richard Ayoade, British actor, director and writer
1977 – Ilia Kulik, Russian figure skater
1978 – Scott Raynor, American drummer 
1979 – Rasual Butler, American basketball player (d. 2018)
  1979   – Brian Campbell, Canadian ice hockey player
1980 – Theofanis Gekas, Greek footballer 
  1980   – Ben Ross, Australian rugby league player 
1983 – Silvio Proto, Belgian-Italian footballer
1984 – Hugo Almeida, Portuguese footballer
1985 – Sebastián Fernández, Uruguayan footballer
  1985   – Teymuraz Gabashvili, Russian tennis player 
  1985   – Wim Stroetinga, Dutch cyclist
  1985   – Ross Wallace, Scottish footballer
1986 – Ryan Coogler, American film director and screenwriter
  1986   – Alexei Sitnikov, Russian-Azerbaijani figure skater
  1986   – Alice Tait, Australian swimmer
  1986   – Ruben Zadkovich, Australian footballer
1987 – Gracie Otto, Australian actress, director, producer, and screenwriter
  1987   – Bray Wyatt, American wrestler 
1988 – Rosanna Crawford, Canadian biathlete
  1988   – Angelo Ogbonna, Italian footballer
  1988   – Morgan Pressel, American golfer
1989 – Ezequiel Schelotto, Italian footballer
1990 – Dan Evans, British tennis player 
  1990   – Kristina Kucova, Slovakian tennis player
  1990   – Oliver Venno, Estonian volleyball player 
1991 – Aaron Donald, American football player 
  1991   – Lena Meyer-Landrut, German singer-songwriter
  1991   – César Pinares, Chilean footballer 
1996 – Katharina Althaus, German ski jumper
  1996   – Emmanuel Boateng, Ghanaian footballer
  1996   – Razvan Marin, Romanian footballer
1997 – Pedro Chirivella, Spanish footballer
  1997   – Coy Craft, American footballer
  1997   – Joe Gomez, English footballer
  1997   – Gustaf Nilsson, Swedish footballer
  1997   – Sam Timmins, New Zealand basketball player 
1998 – Sérgio Sette Câmara, Brazilian racing driver 
  1998   – Salwa Eid Naser, Bahraini track and field sprinter
1999 – James Charles, American internet personality
  1999   – Trinidad Cardona, American singer and songwriter
2000 – Felipe Drugovich, Brazilian-Italian racing driver

Deaths

Pre-1600
 230 – Urban I, pope of the Catholic Church
 922 – Li Sizhao, Chinese general and governor
 962 – Guibert of Gembloux, Frankish abbot (b. 892)
1125 – Henry V, Holy Roman Emperor (b. 1086)
1304 – Jehan de Lescurel, French poet and composer
1338 – Alice de Warenne, Countess of Arundel, English noble (b. 1287)
1370 – Toghon Temür, Mongol emperor (b. 1320)
1423 – Antipope Benedict XIII (b. 1328)
1498 – Girolamo Savonarola, Italian friar and preacher (b. 1452)
1523 – Ashikaga Yoshitane, Japanese shōgun (b. 1466)
1524 – Ismail I, First Emperor of Safavid Empire (b. 1487)
1591 – John Blitheman, English organist and composer (b. 1525)

1601–1900
1662 – John Gauden, English bishop (b. 1605)
1670 – Ferdinando II de' Medici, Grand Duke of Tuscany (b. 1610)
1691 – Adrien Auzout, French astronomer and instrument maker (b. 1622)
1701 – William Kidd, Scottish pirate (b. 1645)
1749 – Abraham ben Abraham, Polish martyr (b. 1700)
1752 – William Bradford, English-American printer (b. 1663)
1754 – John Wood, the Elder, English architect, designed The Circus and Queen Square (b. 1704)
1783 – James Otis, Jr., American lawyer and politician (b. 1725)
1813 – Géraud Duroc, French general and diplomat (b. 1772)
1815 – Gotthilf Heinrich Ernst Muhlenberg, American clergyman and botanist (b. 1753)
1841 – Franz Xaver von Baader, German philosopher and theologian (b. 1765)
1855 – Charles Robert Malden, English lieutenant and explorer (b. 1797)
1857 – Augustin-Louis Cauchy, French mathematician and academic (b. 1789)
1868 – Kit Carson, American general (b. 1809)
1886 – Leopold von Ranke, German historian and academic (b. 1795)
1893 – Anton von Schmerling, Austrian politician (b. 1805)
1895 – Franz Ernst Neumann, German mineralogist, physicist, and mathematician (b. 1798)

1901–present
1906 – Henrik Ibsen, Norwegian director, playwright, and poet (b. 1828)
1908 – François Coppée, French poet and author (b. 1842)
1920 – Svetozar Boroević, Croatian-Austrian field marshal (b. 1856)
1921 – August Nilsson, Swedish shot putter and tug of war competitor (b. 1872)
1934 – Clyde Barrow, American criminal (b. 1909)
  1934   – Mihkel Martna, Estonian journalist and politician (b. 1860)
  1934   – Bonnie Parker, American criminal (b. 1910)
1937 – John D. Rockefeller, American businessman and philanthropist, founded the Standard Oil Company and Rockefeller University (b. 1839)
1938 – Frederick Ruple, Swiss-American painter (b. 1871)
1942 – Panagiotis Toundas, Greek composer and conductor (b. 1886)
1945 – Heinrich Himmler, German commander and politician, Reich Minister of the Interior (b. 1900)
1947 – Charles-Ferdinand Ramuz, Swiss author and poet (b. 1878)
1949 – Jan Frans De Boever, Belgian painter and illustrator (b. 1872)
1956 – Gustav Suits, Latvian-Estonian poet and politician (b. 1883)
1960 – Georges Claude, French engineer and inventor, created Neon lighting (b. 1870)
1962 – Louis Coatalen, French engineer (b. 1879)
1963 – August Jakobson, Estonian author and politician (b. 1904)
1965 – David Smith, American sculptor (b. 1906)
1975 – Moms Mabley, American comedian and actor (b. 1894)
1979 – S. Selvanayagam, Sri Lankan geographer and academic (b. 1932)
1981 – Gene Green, American baseball player (b. 1933)
  1981   – Rayner Heppenstall, English author and poet (b. 1911)
  1981   – George Jessel, American actor, singer, and producer (b. 1898)
  1981   – David Lewis, Belarusian-Canadian lawyer and politician (b. 1909)
1986 – Sterling Hayden, American actor (b. 1916)
1989 – Georgy Tovstonogov, Russian director and producer (b. 1915)
  1989   – Karl Koch, German computer hacker (b. 1965)
1991 – Wilhelm Kempff, German pianist and composer (b. 1895)
  1991   – Jean Van Houtte, Belgian academic and politician, 50th Prime Minister of Belgium (b. 1907)
  1991   – Fletcher Markle, Canadian director, screenwriter, and producer (b. 1921)
1992 – Kostas Davourlis, Greek footballer (b. 1948)
  1992   – Giovanni Falcone, Italian lawyer and judge (b. 1939)
1994 – Olav Hauge, Norwegian poet (b. 1908)
1996 – Kronid Lyubarsky, Russian journalist and activist (b. 1934)
1998 – Telford Taylor, American general and lawyer (b. 1908)
1999 – Owen Hart, Canadian-American wrestler (b. 1965)
2002 – Big Bill Neidjie, Australian activist and last speaker of the Gaagudju language (b. )
  2002   – Sam Snead, American golfer and journalist (b. 1912)
2006 – Lloyd Bentsen, American colonel and politician, 69th United States Secretary of the Treasury (b. 1921)
  2006   – Kazimierz Górski, Polish footballer and manager (b. 1921)
2008 – Iñaki Ochoa de Olza, Spanish mountaineer (b. 1967)
  2008   – Utah Phillips, American singer-songwriter and poet (b. 1935)
2009 – Roh Moo-hyun, South Korean soldier and politician, 9th President of South Korea (b. 1946)
2010 – José Lima, Dominican-American baseball player (b. 1972)
  2010   – Simon Monjack, English director, producer, and screenwriter (b. 1970)
2011 – Xavier Tondo, Spanish cyclist (b. 1978)
2012 – Paul Fussell, American historian, author, and academic (b. 1924)
2013 – Epy Guerrero, Dominican baseball player, coach, and scout (b. 1942)
  2013   – Hayri Kozakçıoğlu, Turkish police officer and politician, 15th Governor of Istanbul Province (b. 1938)
  2013   – Georges Moustaki, Egyptian-French singer-songwriter and guitarist (b. 1934)
  2013   – Flynn Robinson, American basketball player (b. 1941)
2014 – Mikhail Egorovich Alekseev, Russian linguist and academic (b. 1949)
  2014   – Madhav Mantri, Indian cricketer (b. 1921)
2015 – Anne Meara, American actress, comedian and playwright (b. 1929)
  2015   – Aleksey Mozgovoy, Ukrainian sergeant (b. 1975)
  2015   – Alicia Nash, Salvadoran-American physicist and engineer (b. 1933)
  2015   – John Forbes Nash, Jr., American mathematician and academic, Nobel Prize laureate (b. 1928)
2017 – Roger Moore, English actor (b. 1927)
2020 – Hana Kimura, Japanese professional wrestler (b. 1997)
2021 – Ron Hill, English long-distance runner (b. 1938)
  2021   – Eric Carle, American children's book designer, illustrator, and writer best known for The Very Hungry Caterpillar (b. 1929)

Holidays and observances
Aromanian National Day
Christian feast day:
Aaron the Illustrious (Syriac Orthodox Church)
Desiderius of Vienne
Giovanni Battista de' Rossi
Julia of Corsica
Nicolaus Copernicus and Johannes Kepler (Episcopal Church (USA))
Quintian, Lucius and Julian
William of Perth
May 23 (Eastern Orthodox liturgics)
Constitution Day (Germany)
Labour Day (Jamaica)
Students' Day (Mexico)
World Turtle Day

References

External links

 BBC: On This Day
 
 Historical Events on May 23

Days of the year
May